The Louisiade whistler (Pachycephala collaris) is a species of bird in the family Pachycephalidae, which is endemic to the Louisiade Archipelago south-east of New Guinea. It was split from the Bismarck whistler by the IOC in 2015.

Taxonomy and systematics
It has been variably considered a subspecies of a widespread golden whistler (P. pectoralis) or treated as a separate species, but strong published evidence in favour of either treatment is limited, and further study is warranted to resolve the complex taxonomic situation.

Subspecies
Two subspecies are recognized:
 P. c. collaris - Ramsay, 1878: Found in the Louisiade Archipelago except Rossel Island
 P. c. rosseliana - Hartert, 1898: Originally described as a separate species. Found on Rossel  Island (Louisiade Archipelago)

References

Louisiade whistler
Birds of the Louisiade Archipelago
Louisiade whistler